In enzymology, a saccharopine dehydrogenase (NAD+, L-lysine-forming) is an enzyme that catalyzes the chemical reaction

N6-(L-1,3-dicarboxypropyl)-L-lysine + NAD+ + H2O  L-lysine + 2-oxoglutarate + NADH + H+

The 3 substrates of this enzyme are N6-(L-1,3-dicarboxypropyl)-L-lysine, NAD+, and H2O, whereas its 4 products are L-lysine, 2-oxoglutarate, NADH, and H+.

This enzyme belongs to the family of oxidoreductases, specifically those acting on the CH-NH group of donors with NAD+ or NADP+ as acceptor.  The systematic name of this enzyme class is N6-(L-1,3-dicarboxypropyl)-L-lysine:NAD+ oxidoreductase (L-lysine-forming). Other names in common use include lysine-2-oxoglutarate reductase, dehydrogenase, saccharopine (nicotinamide adenine dinucleotide,, lysine forming), epsilon-N-(L-glutaryl-2)-L-lysine:NAD oxidoreductase (L-lysine, forming), N6-(glutar-2-yl)-L-lysine:NAD oxidoreductase (L-lysine-forming), 6-N-(L-1,3-dicarboxypropyl)-L-lysine:NAD+ oxidoreductase, and (L-lysine-forming).  This enzyme participates in lysine biosynthesis and lysine degradation.

Structural studies

As of late 2007, only one structure has been solved for this class of enzymes, with the PDB accession code .

References

 
 

EC 1.5.1
NADH-dependent enzymes
Enzymes of known structure